The Nidda is a right tributary of the river Main in Hesse.

It springs from the Vogelsberg on the Taufstein mountain range near the town of Schotten, flows through the Niddastausee dam, and the towns of Nidda, Niddatal, Karben, and Bad Vilbel.  At Harheim it reaches the Frankfurt am Main city area and after 90 km enters the Main in Frankfurt's Höchst quarter.

In the 1920s and 1960s, the flow of the Nidda was regulated to reduce the risk of floods.  The original numerous meanders turned into bayous, while the riverbed was straightened and made deeper. Since 1993 the Nidda has been partially restored to its natural state and a bicycle path built along the river.

Tributaries

The following rivers are tributaries to the river Nidda (from source to mouth):

Left: Michelbach, Läunsbach, Eichelbach, Hohensteinerbach, Laisbach, Wehrbach, Selzenbach, Nidder, Edelbach

Right: Graswiesenbach, Hohlbach, Gierbach, Ulfa, Salzbach, Hollergraben, Horloff, Wetter, Rosbach, Geringsgraben, Erlenbach, Eschbach, Kalbach, Urselbach, Steinbach, Westerbach and Sulzbach.

References

External links 

 
Rivers of Hesse
Rivers of the Vogelsberg
Rivers of Germany